The Port Huron Civic Theatre (formerly Port Huron Little Theatre) is a historical theatre which started in 1956 in the town of Port Huron, Michigan. For sixteen years, PHLT brought 84 productions to the McMorran Place Theatre stage. In 1976, the theatre purchased and renovated an old church in town for a place of their own. However, in 1983 the theatre returned to McMorran Place Theatre for the larger atmosphere. In 1989, the theatre changed the name to Port Huron Civic Theatre to "better reflect a growing, county-wide membership".

The theatre's board elected to produce "Game Night", the first original play to be produced by the group in its then 55-year term. Produced in the spring of 2011, the play was written by Port Huron resident Jeremy Stemen.

References

 McMorran Place Theatre

External links
 Port Huron Civic Theatre's Official Website
 Port Huron Civic Theatre at Flickr

Port Huron Civic Theatre
Civic Theatre
Buildings and structures in St. Clair County, Michigan
Tourist attractions in St. Clair County, Michigan